The women's 1500 metres event at the 2015 Military World Games was held on 7 and 8 October at the KAFAC Sports Complex.

Records
Prior to this competition, the existing world and CISM record were as follows:

Schedule

Medalists

Results

Round 1
Qualification: First 4 in each heat (Q) and next 4 fastest (q) qualified for the final.

Final

References

1500
2015 in women's athletics